Hellshire Hills is a region of dry limestone hills in St Catherine Parish, Jamaica, which forms part of the Portland Bight Protected Area. The region supports one of the largest remaining areas of dry limestone forest in the Caribbean, and supports endangered Jamaican endemics include the Jamaican iguana and the blue-tailed galliwasp.

A 1970 survey of the forest noted 271 species of plants in the forest of which 53 are only found in Jamaica.

See also
Jamaican dry forests

References

Landforms of Jamaica